is a Japanese novelist and scenario writer for manga. She graduated from Musashino Art University. She wrote the scenarios for Delicious! and Kitchen Princess. In 2006, she won the Kodansha Manga Award in the children's manga category for Kitchen Princess.

References

External links
 

Female comics writers
Japanese female comics artists
Japanese women writers
Living people
Manga artists
Women manga artists
Year of birth missing (living people)